This is a list of electoral divisions and wards in the ceremonial county of Buckinghamshire in South East England. All changes since the re-organisation of local government following the passing of the Local Government Act 1972 are shown. The number of councillors elected for each electoral division or ward is shown in brackets.

Buckinghamshire Council

Buckinghamshire
Electoral Divisions from 1 April 1974 (first election 12 April 1973) to 2 May 1985:

Electoral Divisions from 2 May 1985 to 5 May 2005:

Electoral Divisions from 5 May 2005 to 2 May 2013:

† minor boundary changes in 2009

Electoral Divisions from 2 May 2013 to present:

Milton Keynes
Wards from 1 April 1974 (first election 7 June 1973) to 6 May 1976:

Wards from 6 May 1976 to 2 May 1996:

Wards from 2 May 1996 to 2 May 2002:

Wards from 2 May 2002 to 22 May 2014:

Wards from 22 May 2014 to present:

Former district councils

Aylesbury Vale
Wards from 1 April 1974 (first election 7 June 1973) to 6 May 1976:

Wards from 6 May 1976 to 1 May 2003:

Wards from 1 May 2003 to 7 May 2015:

† minor boundary changes in 2007

Wards from 7 May 2015 to present:

Chiltern
Wards from 1 April 1974 (first election 7 June 1973) to 6 May 1976:

Wards from 6 May 1976 to 1 May 2003:

Wards from 1 May 2003 to present:

† minor boundary changes in 2007

South Bucks
Wards from 1 April 1974 (first election 7 June 1973) to 5 May 1983:

Wards from 5 May 1983 to 1 May 2003:

Wards from 1 May 2003 to 7 May 2015:

† minor boundary changes in 2007

Wards from 7 May 2015 to present:

Wycombe
Wards from 1 April 1974 (first election 7 June 1973) to 5 May 1983:

Wards from 5 May 1983 to 1 May 2003:

Wards from 1 May 2003 to present:

Electoral wards by constituency

Aylesbury
Aston Clinton, Aylesbury Central, Bedgrove, Bledlow and Bradenham, Coldharbour, Elmhurst and Watermead, Gatehouse, Greater Hughenden, Lacey Green, Mandeville and Elm Farm, Oakfield, Quarrendon, Southcourt, Speen and the Hampdens, Stokenchurch and Radnage, Walton Court and Hawkslade, Wendover.

Beaconsfield
Beaconsfield North, Beaconsfield South, Beaconsfield West, Bourne End-cum-Hedsor, Burnham Beeches, Burnham Church, Burnham Lent Rise, Denham North, Denham South, Dorney and Burnham South, Farnham Royal, Flackwell Heath and Little Marlow, Gerrards Cross East and Denham South West, Gerrards Cross North, Gerrards Cross South, Hedgerley and Fulmer, Iver Heath, Iver Village and Richings Park, Marlow North and West, Marlow South East, Stoke Poges, Taplow, The Wooburns, Wexham and Iver West.

Buckingham
Bierton, Brill, Buckingham North, Buckingham South, Cheddington, Edlesborough, Great Brickhill, Great Horwood, Grendon Underwood, Haddenham, Icknield, Long Crendon, Luffield Abbey, Marsh Gibbon, Newton Longville, Pitstone, Quainton, Steeple Claydon, Stewkley, The Risboroughs, Tingewick, Waddesdon, Weedon, Wing, Wingrave, Winslow.

Chesham and Amersham
Amersham Common, Amersham-on-the-Hill, Amersham Town, Asheridge Vale and Lowndes, Ashley Green, Latimer and Chenies, Austenwood, Ballinger, South Heath and Chartridge, Central, Chalfont Common, Chalfont St Giles, Chesham Bois and Weedon Hill, Cholesbury, The Lee and Bellingdon, Gold Hill, Great Missenden, Hilltop and Townsend, Holmer Green, Little Chalfont, Little Missenden, Newtown, Penn and Coleshill, Prestwood and Heath End, Ridgeway, St Mary's and Waterside, Seer Green, Vale.

Milton Keynes North
Bradwell, Campbell Park, Hanslope Park, Linford North, Linford South, Middleton, Newport Pagnell North, Newport Pagnell South, Olney, Sherington, Stantonbury, Wolverton.

Milton Keynes South
Bletchley and Fenny Stratford, Danesborough, Denbigh, Eaton Manor, Emerson Valley, Furzton, Loughton Park, Stony Stratford, Walton Park, Whaddon, Woughton.

Wycombe
Abbey, Booker and Cressex, Bowerdean, Chiltern Rise, Disraeli, Downley and Plomer Hill, Greater Marlow, Hambleden Valley, Hazlemere North, Hazlemere South, Micklefield, Oakridge and Castlefield, Ryemead, Sands, Terriers and Amersham Hill, Totteridge, Tylers Green and Loudwater.

See also
List of parliamentary constituencies in Buckinghamshire

References

 
Buckinghamshire
Wards